Wilhelmus Nicolaas Antonius (Wim) Klever (born 1930, Snelrewaard) is a Dutch scholar interested in the philosophy of 17th century Jewish Dutch philosopher Baruch Spinoza.

Klever studied philosophy at the Catholic University of Nijmegen and at the Utrecht University.

He is a former lecturer at the Erasmus University in Rotterdam. He also studied the lives and biographies of the people in the circle around Spinoza.  This has resulted in numerous publications and books.

Works
 Ethicom, ofwel Spinoza's Ethica vertolkt in tekst en commentaar, Eburon Delft, 1996
 Mannen rondom Spinoza, Uitgeverij Verloren, Hilversum, 1997,

References

1930 births
Living people
20th-century Dutch philosophers
Academic staff of Erasmus University Rotterdam
Radboud University Nijmegen alumni
Utrecht University alumni
People from Oudewater
Spinoza scholars